The Porcelain Magician is a collection of oriental fantasy short stories  by American writer Frank Owen.   It was first published in hardcover by Gnome Press in 1948. The stories originally appeared in the magazines Weird Tales,  Mystery Magazine and The Dance Magazine

Contents
 Foreword, by David A. Kyle
"The Fan"
"The Inverted House"
"The Lantern Maker"
"The Porcelain Magician"
"The Purple Sea"
"The Old Man Who Swept the Sky"
"Doctor Shen Fu"
"Pale Pink Porcelain"
"The Rice Merchant"
"The Blue City"
"The Fountain"
"Monk's Blood"
"The Golden Hour of Kwoh Fan"
"The Wind That Tramps the World"

References

1948 short story collections
Fantasy short story collections
Gnome Press books